Mizuo Peck (born August 18, 1977) is an American actress. She is best known for playing Sacagawea in the Night at the Museum film series.

Life and career
Peck was born and raised in New York. Her father was from Hamden, Connecticut. As a child, Peck was a member of the TADA! Youth Theater. She graduated with a BFA degree in Theater from the SUNY Purchase Conservatory of Theatre Arts. Peck joined the Screen Actor's Guild on her 18th birthday and has done many commercials, voice-overs and print campaigns for Levi's, Verizon, Kitchen Aid and Oil of Olay.

Peck's most notable role may be the historical Native American figure Sacagawea in the Night at the Museum film series. Her other film credits include A Case of You, Almost in Love, and Scenes of the Crime. Her television credits include Law & Order: Criminal Intent, a recurring role on All My Children, and the sci-fi police drama Witchblade.

On stage, Peck has done plays that were part of the New York International Fringe Festival, the Samuel French Play Festival, and the New Performance Series at the Incubator Arts Project. At the Public Theater, she performed Suzan-Lori Parks 365 Days/365 Plays and All's Well That Ends Well as a company member of the Shakespeare Lab Program.

Peck has been photographed for French Vogue as well as for the cover of L'Uomo Vogue. At the Whitney Biennial in 2010, her voice accompanied an art installation by the Bruce High Quality Foundation.

Filmography

Film

Television

Other work
 Starred in Thee Shambels' music video The Girl at the Bottom of the World (2013).
 Cameos in Clay Aiken's music video The Way.
 Article in My Name Is... section of Vapors Magazine.

References

External links

 Official website
 

1977 births
Living people
Actresses from New York City
American actresses of Japanese descent
State University of New York at Purchase alumni
American film actresses
American film actors of Asian descent
21st-century American women